The following events occurred in March 1964:

March 1, 1964 (Sunday)
Anti-government demonstrations began in Gabon, with protesters shouting "Léon M'ba, président des Français!" ("Léon M'ba, President of the French!") and calling for the end of the "dictatorship".
HMCS Athabaskan of the Royal Canadian Navy rescued 34 of her 36 crew.
The American première of Karlheinz Stockhausen's Momente, performed by Martina Arroyo (soprano), the Crane Collegiate Singers of SUNY Potsdam (Brock McElheran, chorus master), and members of the Buffalo Philharmonic Orchestra (Lukas Foss, music director), conducted by the composer, took place in Kleinhans Music Hall in Buffalo, New York.
Eighty-five people were killed when Paradise Airlines Flight 901 crashed into a mountain in while on its way to Tahoe Valley, California, a ski resort town across the border from casinos in Nevada. Wreckage of the plane, a propeller-driven Lockheed Constellation, was located the next day on an  ridge in the Sierra Nevada mountains, where it had impacted after running into a sudden snowstorm while on its approach to Tahoe Valley. Twenty passengers had taken off with the plane from Salinas and another 61 boarded at San Jose. Fifteen other people in San Jose had wanted to board Flight 901 but were told that they would have to catch a later plane.
Born: Florencio Randazzo, Argentine politician, in Chivilcoy
Died: Richard Welsh, a professional skydiver celebrating his 29th birthday, killed by an accident blamed on his habit of screaming while pretending to fall off of an airplane and on the fact that he had no pocket on his outfit. Lacking a pocket, Welsh had clinched the handle of his parachute's ripcord between his teeth, but when he opened his mouth as he fell, the cord flew over his shoulder. As he fell  to his death, Welsh was seen "groping desperately all the way down" trying to grab the cord to open the chute; his body, along with his unopened parachute, was found in the backyard of a home in Delhi Township, Michigan.

March 2, 1964 (Monday)
President Joseph Kasavubu of the Congo suspended the parliament indefinitely, after more than half of the 137 deputies of the Central Assembly failed to appear in Léopoldville, whether out of fear of arrest or because of joining a rebellion against the Congolese government.
Mount Villarrica, a volcano in Chile, erupted suddenly, triggering an avalanche that buried the village of Coñaripe. Twenty-two people were reported killed and 35 others missing.
After modifications, a U-2 spyplane was able to successfully land on an aircraft carrier, as pilot Bob Schumacher brought the high-altitude jet down onto the USS Ranger. Previously, the plane's use had been limited to sites within a  radius of a U.S. base, and some areas of the globe were beyond its reach until it could operate from a mobile airstrip.
Born: Laird Hamilton, American big-wave surfer and co-inventor of tow-in surfing, in San Francisco

March 3, 1964 (Tuesday)
The Kingdom of Saudi Arabia and the United Arab Republic resumed diplomatic relations after six years, following a meeting between Prince Faisal and President Nasser at the Arab Summit in Cairo.
The Tsurugisan Quasi-National Park was founded in Japan.

March 4, 1964 (Wednesday)

Teamsters President Jimmy Hoffa was found guilty by a federal jury in Chattanooga, Tennessee on two counts of jury tampering that had happened in 1962.  The conviction was the first after four previous trials on other federal charges had ended in an acquittal.  Hoffa was released after posting a new bail bond for $75,000 pending the appeal of the verdict and his 8-year prison sentence.  His appeals would finally be exhausted three years later, and he would begin his sentence on March 7, 1967.
Mark Lane, an attorney from New York City, asked for and was granted the opportunity to appear before the Warren Commission for the stated purpose of representing the interests of the late Lee Harvey Oswald, who had been charged with the assassination of President John F. Kennedy.  Lane, who would write the bestselling book Rush to Judgment and who would become the most well-known proponent of JFK conspiracy theories, showed the group news photographs from the assassination scene which he believed had been altered.  Commission member and future U.S. President Gerald Ford told reporters later that Lane "was given a fair hearing.  He put his ideas in the record, and all will be checked out."  
The United Nations Security Council unanimously adopted Resolution 186, providing for a multinational peacekeeping force for Cyprus.  UNFICYP would become operational on March 27.

March 5, 1964 (Thursday)
The Republic of Zanzibar prohibited the use of the pulled rickshaw on its streets, banning the human-pulled taxi as a symbol of feudal exploitation.
British Army troops engaged in combat in Cyprus for the first time, when two soldiers fired back at Turkish Cypriot combatants in the predominantly Turkish village of Karmi. The gunfire began after an army unit was sent to protect Greek Cypriot schoolchildren.
Following an attempted coup in Gabon, some Gabonese mistakenly accused the United States as a co-conspirator in the recent coup attempt that had temporarily overthrown President Leon M'Ba, and bombed the U.S. Embassy in Libreville. The explosion, which occurred at a time when the building was closed and locked, "cracked two windows, partially demolished the embassy sign and splattered mud over the front of the building."
Gemini launch vehicle (GLV) 1 and Gemini spacecraft No. 1 were mechanically mated at complex 19. Before GLV and spacecraft were electrically mated, the launch vehicle's status was reverified with a Combined Systems Test (CST) performed on March 10. A special series of Electronic-Electrical Interference (EEI) Tests began March 12 and ended March 25. Evaluation of test results confirmed that the intent of EEI testing had been accomplished, despite some persistent anomalies. A successful post-EEI systems reverification CST was performed March 27.

March 6, 1964 (Friday)
The original version of the Soviet Union's MiG-25 supersonic jet fighter, referred to in the West as the "Foxbat", was flown for the first time. "These amazing aircraft", an author would note, "were to sustain the biggest development programme in history, leading to forty-nine versions, of which thirty-three flew and more than twenty entered service."

King Paul of Greece died at the age of 62 of post-operative complications following surgery for stomach cancer. His 23-year-old son became King Constantine II.
The literacy test for Mississippi voters was upheld as a three-judge panel of the U.S. District Court in Jackson ruled, 2–1, that the state law did not violate the U.S. Constitution. The U.S. Department of Justice had brought suit to challenge a requirement that voters had to be, within the judgment of a county official, of good moral character and that they had to be able to read and write, and to be able to interpret selected sections of law. Historically, the literacy test had more often disenfranchised African Americans than white residents. The tests would be outlawed for federal elections by the passage of the Voting Rights Act of 1965.
Martin-Baltimore received the propellant tanks for Gemini launch vehicle 4 from Martin-Denver, which had begun fabricating them in November 1963. Tank splicing was completed July 21. Aerojet-General delivered the stage II flight engine June 26 and the stage I engine July 28. Engine installation was completed September 4. Final horizontal tests were completed and reviewed October 26, with Martin authorized to erect the vehicle in the vertical test facility.
Five members of the crew, including the ship's captain, were killed, while the U.S. Coast Guard was able to rescue 25 others from icy water. The ship, which was empty at the time and would normally have carried a crew of 44, had departed and was on its way to pick up a cargo of gasoline at Portland. As a result of the accident, the National Maritime Union would successfully lobby for inflatable life rafts to be placed on all ships owned by companies that had contracts with NMU members.

March 7, 1964 (Saturday)
The government of the People's Republic of China issued the new list of simplified Chinese characters, following up on the first reform of 1956, with a complete list of 2,236 revisions of traditional Chinese characters.  The Jianhuazi Zongbiao required fewer strokes and were easier to write.
Asadollah Alam resigned as Prime Minister of Iran to take the job of minister of the Shah's imperial court, and was replaced two hours later by Hassan Ali Mansur. Mansour would be assassinated less than a year later, dying on January 26, 1965. 
Born:
Wanda Sykes, African-American comedienne, in Portsmouth, Virginia 
Vladimir Smirnov, Kazakhstani cross-country skiing world champion; in Shuchinsk, Kazakh SSR, Soviet Union
Died: Franz Alexander, 73, Hungarian-American psychoanalyst and physician, pioneer of psychosomatic medicine and psychoanalytic criminology.

March 8, 1964 (Sunday)

Malcolm X, who had been suspended from the Nation of Islam, announced in New York City that he was forming a black nationalist party. "I remain a Muslim," he told reporters, "but the main emphasis of the new movement will be black nationalism as a political concept and form of social action against the white oppressors."   Three days later, he incorporated his new organization as Muslim Mosque, Inc. and established a headquarters at the Hotel Theresa in the Harlem section of New York City, at 125th Street and Seventh Avenue.
Karol Wojtyla was enthroned as the Roman Catholic Archbishop of Krakow at the Wawel Cathedral in Poland's city of Krakow. In 1978, Archbishop Wojtyla would become Pope John Paul II.  
A DC-3 airplane, operated by Taxader Air Lines, crashed in Colombia while making a flight from Pereira to Bogota, killing the 25 passengers and five crew.

March 9, 1964 (Monday)
The United States Supreme Court ruled in New York Times Co. v Sullivan that under the First Amendment, a state was limited in its power to award damages for libel arising from criticism of public officials acting within the scope of their duties. L. B. Sullivan, the police commissioner of Montgomery, Alabama, had been awarded US$500,000 in damages in a libel suit against The New York Times after the Times had run an advertisement on March 29, 1960, accusing Sullivan of overseeing "a wave of terror" against African-Americans.
The first Ford Mustang rolled off the assembly line at the Ford Motor Company factory in Dearborn, Michigan. A researcher would note later that what he believed to have been the first Mustang marked for shipment (based on having the lowest vehicle identification number that had been found to exist, 100211) was sent to fill an order by the Hull-Dobbs Ford dealership in Winston-Salem, North Carolina, but added that "no record... has been discovered that indicates the VIN number of the first Mustang to roll off the line on that Monday", and that any promotional photo of the first car "typically... would picture a pre-production car purposely placed at the head of the line".
A woman found on a sidewalk in Tulsa, Oklahoma, was saved from death despite having a body temperature of only 59.5 °F (12 °C) on arrival at the Hillcrest Medical Center. After 90 minutes, her temperature was recorded at 67 °F (19 °C). A physician at the hospital, Dr. Edward Jenkins, credited the survival of Mrs. Marie Adams to the fact that she had been drunk and that the alcohol in her system led to an unusually quick loss of body heat and a drastic reduction in her body's need for oxygen. Mrs. Adams's injuries were limited to numb fingertips and pain in her throat and chest.
Died: Paul von Lettow-Vorbeck, 93, General of the Imperial German Army during World War One, and known as Der Löwe von Afrika ("The Lion of Africa") for his defense of Germany's African colonies against a much larger force of Allied troops.

March 10, 1964 (Tuesday)
Voters in New Hampshire overwhelmingly approved the first legal state lottery in the United States since 1895, with 114,987 in favor and only 31,327 against.  The format for the  New Hampshire Sweepstakes had already been arranged and printed in advance of the vote, with the first sweepstakes ticket ready to go on sale two days later. 
Henry Cabot Lodge, Jr., the U.S. Ambassador to South Vietnam, won the Republican primary in New Hampshire, the first contest in the race for the Party's nomination for the candidate for President of the United States. Because he had waited until the week before to file his candidacy, Lodge's name was not on the printed ballots and he won as a write-in candidate, receiving 33,007 written votes, compared to 20,692 for Barry Goldwater and 19,504 for Nelson Rockefeller.  Richard M. Nixon, though not on the ballot, got 15,587 write-ins.  Lodge, a native of nearby Massachusetts, was believed by political commentators to have the advantage of being a New England politician.  Despite the win, Lodge told reporters in Saigon that he had no plans to return to the United States to campaign.  
Voters in the United Arab Republic (Egypt) chose from 1,648 candidates for the 350 elective seats of the National Assembly.  The unicameral legislature had two deputies for each of its 175 electoral districts and an additional 10 members appointed by President Gamal Abdel Nasser.
Soviet military forces shot down an unarmed American RB-66 reconnaissance bomber that had strayed into East Germany.  The three crew members parachuted to safety and were arrested by Soviet soldiers near the East German village of Gardelegen.  1st Lieutenant Harold W. Welch, who had fractured an arm and a leg, would be released March 21, and U.S. Army captains David I. Holland and Melvin J. Kessler would be set free on March 27.
The Soviet Union won the first computer chess game in the first competition between the U.S. and the U.S.S.R., Moscow's ITEP system checkmating Stanford University's Kotok-McCarthy program on its 19th move.  Four games, played simultaneously, had started on November 21, with the each side's move being telegraphed to the other for a programmed response.  The Soviets would win a second game, and the other two would end in a draw, giving the USSR a 3 points to 1 victory.
Born: Prince Edward, the fourth (and youngest) child of Queen Elizabeth II of the United Kingdom and her husband Prince Philip, Duke of Edinburgh, at Buckingham Palace.

March 11, 1964 (Wednesday)

Raúl Leoni was inaugurated as President of Venezuela, becoming "the first democratically elected president of Venezuela to succeed another so elected."  Delegates from 50 nations were on hand in Caracas to watch outgoing president Rómulo Betancourt hand over the presidential sash  to Leoni at the end of Betancourt's five-year term.
Gene Roddenberry wrote a 16-page proposal for a science fiction television show that he tentatively titled "Star Trek".
The Trident jet airliner made its first commercial flight, flying from London to Copenhagen for British European Airways (BEA).  Regular service would begin on April 1. 
At the 21st Golden Globe Awards, award-winners included Sidney Poitier, Leslie Caron and Elia Kazan.
President of Finland Urho Kekkonen left Poland and began a state visit to the Estonian SSR in the Soviet Union as the guest of General Secretary Leonid Brezhnev.  It marked the reopening of relations between Finland and the USSR.
Born: 
Leena Lehtolainen, Finnish crime novelist, in Vesanto
Shane Richie, English comedian, actor and singer, in Harlesden, London 
Died: Cleo Madison, 80, American silent film actress

March 12, 1964 (Thursday)

John W. King, the Governor of New Hampshire, paid three dollars at the Rockingham Park racetrack in Salem, to buy the first state lottery ticket legally sold in the United States in the 20th century. Governor King purchased ticket number 0000001 for the New Hampshire Sweepstakes, two days after voters had approved lottery sales tickets at the state's two racetracks and 49 state operated liquor stores. On the first day of sales, 3,600 people hoping to win $100,000 (on September 12) bought tickets. Starting on July 15, the random drawing of 332 tickets would take place to link a name to one of the 332 racehorses registered at the Park, followed by five more drawings before 11 of the horses would run at Rockingham. In all, six people, randomly associated with the winning horse, would each receive $100,000 before taxes.
The U.S. House of Representatives voted against raising their salaries by 45 percent (from $22,500 to $32,500 annually), declining, 184–222, to approve a bill that would have raised the salaries of 1.7 million other U.S. government employees. While the original intention was to have the measure made subject to a voice vote, where it would not be clear which individual Congress members wanted to give themselves pay raises, about one half of those present supported a motion to put the matter to a roll call vote. For the record, Democrats supported the measure 149 to 86, while the Republican vote was only 35 for and 136 against.
Edward Z. Gray, Advanced Manned Missions Director in the Office of Manned Space Flight, asked Langley Research Center (LaRC) Director Charles J. Donlan to prepare a Project Development Plan for the Manned Orbital Research Laboratory, studies for which were already underway at the Center and under contract. This plan was needed as documentation for any possible decision to initiate an orbital research laboratory project. (Gray had also asked Manned Spacecraft Center to submit similar plans for an Apollo X, an Apollo Orbital Research Laboratory, and a Large Orbital Research Laboratory.) In addition to the Project Development Plan, Gray asked for system specifications for each candidate orbital laboratory system; both of these would form the basis for a project proposal with little delay "should a climate exist in which a new project can be started."
Symphony in D for Cello and Orchestra, by English composer Benjamin Britten, was given its first performance. Britten conducted the Moscow Philharmonic Orchestra in the debut of his work and dedicated it to Russian cellist Mstislav Rostropovich.
Died: Abbas al-Aqqad, 74, Egyptian journalist, poet and philosopher

March 13, 1964 (Friday)

A cautionary tale in "not wanting to get involved" happened when the murder of Kitty Genovese took place outside her apartment building in the upper-middle-class neighborhood of Kew Gardens in the New York borough of Queens.  New York Police Department investigators were dumbfounded to discover that 38 different "respectable, law-abiding citizens" admitted that they had witnessed the crime, but that none of them had telephoned the police until more than half an hour later, after the killer had returned to the scene a third time to stab 28-year old Catherine Genovese to death.  Miss Genovese, the manager of a bar, was returning from work when she was attacked.  Forty-two years later, a researcher would write in American Heritage magazine, "The true number of eyewitnesses was not 38 but 6 or 7," and added that "The Times article that incited all this industry about an urban horror was almost certainly a misleading account of what happened."  A month later, Winston Moseley would confess to killing Ms. Genovese and two other women.  Moseley would be given a sentence of death, later commuted to life imprisonment, and would live 52 more years after the murder, passing away inside the Clinton Correctional Facility in New York on March 28, 2016, at the age of 81.
A 65-man patrol of the Peruvian Army came under attack from a tribe of Coquima Indians in as it attempted to follow smugglers near the Amazon basin jungles.  At the Mariscal Ramón Castilla Province, near the Peruvian side of the Yavarí River marking the boundary between Peru and Brazil, one soldier was killed by a poison-tipped arrow when his unit was ambushed, and another was killed by an arrow the next day.  The Indian casualties, caused by Peruvian gunfire, bombs, rockets and napalm, were reported to be 33 dead.
Brazil nationalized the six remaining privately owned oil refineries in the South American nation, and in a separate decree, authorized government seizure of all unused farm lands that were adjacent to highways, railroad lines and canals.  The decrees were signed by President João Goulart in front of a mass gathering of 200,000 people outside the Central Brazilian Railroad station in Rio de Janeiro, and left military leaders with the conclusion that they would need to remove Goulart from office.

March 14, 1964 (Saturday)

A jury in Dallas, Texas, found Jack Ruby guilty of murdering Lee Harvey Oswald, the accused assassin of U.S. president John F. Kennedy, and recommended that his punishment be execution in the electric chair.  Ruby's conviction would be reversed on appeal, and he would die of cancer, in 1967, before a new trial could be held.
The first large contingent of the multinational UNFICYP peacekeeping force for Cyprus, with soldiers from the Canadian Army, followed in the next three weeks by troops from Ireland, Sweden, Denmark, Finland and Austria.  
The 2nd Daily Mirror Trophy motor race was held at Snetterton Motor Racing Circuit, England, and was won by Innes Ireland.

March 15, 1964 (Sunday)
In what one historian would describe as "the earliest expression" of "antiwar feeling among American college students" in response to the Vietnam War, students at Yale University concluded a three-day long conference on socialism that included members of the new Students for a Democratic Society, and launched the "May 2nd Movement" (M2M), and adjourned with plans for an antiwar demonstration in New York City for May 2, 1964.

Actors Richard Burton and Elizabeth Taylor, who had co-starred in the 1963 film Cleopatra as lovers Mark Antony and Cleopatra, respectively, married in Montreal.  The two would divorce in 1974, and then remarry in 1975 before divorcing again in 1976.
Born: Rockwell (stage name for Kennedy William Gordy), American rock musician known for his hit son Somebody's Watching Me; in Detroit
Died: Zbigniew Jan Dunikowski, 74, Polish born "alchemist" and convicted swindler who claimed that he had discovered a process for synthesizing gold from the silica in ordinary sand.  After persuading investors to purchase shares of his Belgian company, Metallex, he was arrested in 1931 and sentenced to two years in a French prison following his conviction for fraud.

March 16, 1964 (Monday)
Following up on his promise in the 1964 State of the Union address to raise living standards in America, U.S. President Lyndon Johnson sent a detailed message to the U.S. Congress, declaring "I have called for a national war on poverty.  Our objective: total victory."  Johnson, who opened by writing "We are citizens of the richest and most fortunate nation in the history of the world," asked for a $962,000,000 program to help "millions of Americans—one fifth of our people—who have not shared in the abundance which has been granted to most of us, and on whom the gates of opportunity have been closed."
Dundee's "Royal Arch", originally erected in the 1850s to commemorate a visit to the city by Queen Victoria and her husband, Prince Albert, was demolished to make way for the construction of the Tay Road Bridge.
Died: 
Lino Enea Spilimbergo, 67, Argentinian artist
Abdul-Wahab Mirjan, 54, former Prime Minister of Iraq who resigned two months before the assassination of both the King of Iraq and his successor as premier

March 17, 1964 (Tuesday)
What would become known as the "domino theory" became the basis for American policy on Vietnam, after U.S. President Johnson approved National Security Action Memorandum 288 and the recommendations made to him by Secretary of Defense Robert S. McNamara. "We seek an independent non-Communist South Vietnam," McNamara wrote, adding that "unless we can achieve this objective... almost all of Southeast Asia will probably fall under Communist dominance", starting with South Vietnam, Laos, and Cambodia, followed by Burma and Malaysia. "Thailand might hold for a period with our help, but would be under grave pressure. Even the Philippines would become shaky, and the threat to India to the west, Australia and New Zealand to the south, and Taiwan, Korea, and Japan to the north and east would be greatly increased."
Joan Merriam Smith, a 27-year-old test pilot from Long Beach, California, departed from Oakland at 1:01 in the afternoon in a quest to become the first woman to fly solo around the world.
From March 17 to 19, the Gemini structures panel met to review and clear up all open items concerning the structural integrity of the interface between the spacecraft adapter section and the launch vehicle upper skirt. An unexpected snag developed when an analysis by Aerospace indicated load factors about 10 times greater than McDonnell had predicted. Further analysis by McDonnell confirmed its original estimate.
Born: 
Rob Lowe, American film actor, in Charlottesville, Virginia
Regal Gleam, American thoroughbred racehorse and 1966 American Champion Two-Year-Old Filly (died 1976)

March 18, 1964 (Wednesday)
The Soviet Union launched the technology demonstration satellite Kosmos 26 from the Mayak Launch Complex at Kapustin Yar.
Approximately 50 Moroccan students broke into the embassy of Morocco in the Soviet Union and staged an all‐day sit-in protesting against the sentencing of 11 people to death for the alleged assassination attempt of Moroccan King Hassan II.
In a private speech to American diplomats, Thomas C. Mann, the U.S. Under-Secretary of State for Inter-American Affairs, announced a reversal of American foreign policy in the Western Hemisphere. The U.S. Ambassadors to the nations in Latin America had been summoned to Washington for an observance of the third anniversary of President Kennedy's Alliance for Progress initiative, and Mann set aside the American policy of refusing to recognize or aid nations where dictatorships operated in place of democratic government. Henceforward, American policy would be nonintervention in the internal affairs of Latin American republics, and an emphasis on promoting economic growth, opposing the spread of Communism, and protecting American investments. The New York Times would reveal the details of the secret meeting and dub the change in policy the "Mann Doctrine".
Bobby Fischer played a simultaneous chess event in Cleveland, Ohio, winning 51 of 52 games.
Died:
Joseph T. O'Callahan, 58, American Jesuit priest and U.S. Navy Commander who became (in 1946) the first Navy chaplain (and the first chaplain since the Civil War) to win the Medal of Honor
Norbert Wiener, 69, American mathematician and developer of cybernetics

March 19, 1964 (Thursday)
Troops from South Vietnam, accompanied by U.S. Army advisers, mistakenly crossed the border into Cambodia and attacked the village of Chanthrea, killing 17 civilians.
The Foreign Ministry of Luxembourg announced that its head of state, the Grand Duchess Charlotte, would soon abdicate after a reign of 45 years, and turn the monarchy over to her 43-year-old son, Jean.
Sir Edward Boyle, the British Minister of Education, announced that his Ministry had officially approved the 43-symbol Initial Teaching Alphabet for schoolchildren just beginning to read. The I.T.A. had been devised by another member of parliament, James Pitman, who said that as many as 10,000 British children (and 2,000 American children) had learned to read using the alternative alphabet since its introduction as an experiment by the University of London in September 1961.
The British government announced plans to build three new towns in South East England to provide housing near overpopulated London. One of these was centred on the village of Milton Keynes in north Buckinghamshire.
In the United Kingdom, power dispute talks broke down and it was feared that supply disruptions would follow industrial action.
The Air Force Systems Command weekly report (inaugurated in September 1963) summarizing actions taken to resolve Titan II development problems would no longer be issued. George E. Mueller, NASA Associate Administrator for Manned Space Flight, informed Associate Administrator Robert C. Seamans, Jr., that the launch vehicle "no longer appears to be the pacing item in the Gemini program."
Jerrie Mock, a 38-year-old housewife in Columbus, Ohio, departed from that city's airport on her quest to become the first woman to fly solo around the world, two days after Joan Merriam Smith had departed on the same venture. For the next 29 days, readers of newspapers worldwide would follow the progress of Mrs. Mock and Mrs. Smith to see who would complete the task first. Mrs. Smith's two-day start was offset by engine trouble that delayed her in Dutch Guiana for a week. Mrs. Smith had gotten as far as Australia, landing at Darwin on April 17. Mrs. Smith, who had repeatedly encountered engine trouble, would become the second woman to fly solo around the world, landing back at Oakland on May 12.
The American communications satellite Relay II made the first transmission of a live television broadcast from Japan to the United States.

March 20, 1964 (Friday)
Anti-Muslim rioting broke out in the Indian steel-manufacturing city of Rourkela, located in the Orissa state (now called Odisha), after a trainload of Hindu refugees arrived from East Pakistan (now Bangladesh) and described atrocities that had befallen them at the hands of Bengali Muslims. At least 115 people were killed during the night, mostly Muslims who were stabbed or hacked to death. The violence spread into the states of West Bengal, Bihar, Madhya Pradesh, Jharkhand and Chhattisgarh. By the time that the Indian Army suppressed the mayhem, the official death toll after three weeks was 346, although "unofficial estimates by informed sources put the death total at possibly 700" and the government of Pakistan said that as many as 2,000 Muslims had been massacred.
The Supreme Soviet of the Soviet Union passed a decree that provided for a more liberal system of parole and probation, allowing "conditional release from deprivation of freedom" for well-behaved and able-bodied prisoners after they had served only one-fifth of their sentences. An inmate who "demonstrated the desire to redeem his guilt through honest work" was required to stay within an administrative region designated by the government, and to work on construction projects such as chemical plants, oil refineries or factories.
ESRO, the European Space Research Organization and a precursor to the European Space Agency, was established in accordance with an agreement signed on June 14, 1962.
Manned Spacecraft Center (MSC) approved Air Force Space Systems Division's (SSD) recommendations for a test program to increase confidence in 16 critical electronic and electrical components of the Gemini Agena target vehicle. The program included complete electromagnetic interference (EMI) testing of all components peculiar to the Gemini mission, as well as elevated stress tests and extended life tests. SSD had also recommended subsystem-level, as well as component-level, EMI testing, but this part of the program MSC disapproved. SSD directed Lockheed to proceed with the program on March 23. EMI tests were scheduled to be completed by July 1, stress and life tests by September 1, 1964.
The Houston Press, one of the three daily newspapers serving Houston, Texas, published its final issue. Founded on September 25, 1911, the Press was later acquired by the Scripps-Howard chain and was sold to the rival Houston Chronicle.
Died: Brendan Behan, 41, Irish poet, novelist and dramatist

March 21, 1964 (Saturday)
Non ho l'età, with music by Nicola Salerno, text by Mario Panzeri, and sung by 16-year-old Gigliola Cinquetti, won the Eurovision Song Contest 1964 for Italy.
The U.S. Joint Chiefs of Staff presented President Johnson with its recommendations for Operation Square Dance, a plan to destroy Cuba's entire sugar crop in order to cause the collapse of its socialist government led by prime minister Fidel Castro. President Johnson refused to approve the operation because of the hardship upon the general population, and would discontinue all sabotage plans against Cuba less than three weeks later.
In San Diego, California, the first of the SeaWorld theme parks opened.
The UCLA Bruins won the NCAA basketball championship, beating the Duke University Blue Devils, 98–83, in Kansas City, Missouri. During the 1963–1964 season, the Bruins won all 26 of their regular games and the four playoff games.

March 22, 1964 (Sunday)

Venus de Milo, the famed 2000-year-old Greek statue, was found to be slightly damaged as it arrived in Yokohama for transfer to the National Museum of Western Art in Tokyo on loan from the Louvre Museum in Paris. Already missing both of its arms, the statue was found to have sustained four chips "from the folds of her robe below the hip on the left side". Venus de Milo had been shipped from Marseilles on February 18 on board the French ocean liner Vietnam.
PIDE, the security police for the dictatorship in Portugal, announced in a press release that it had arrested several extremists who were plotting to overthrow Portuguese Prime Minister António de Oliveira Salazar and President Francisco Franco of Spain. According to the police, the plotters were going to unite the two neighboring republics into a single Union of Iberia, to be ruled by a former Portuguese presidential candidate, General Umberto Delgado.
Carol Mann won the 1964 Women's Western Open golf tournament in Florida.
The 1964 USAC Championship Car season began at Avondale, Arizona, with A. J. Foyt winning the Phoenix 100.
Born: Nicholas Patrick, British-born American astronaut who flew on two space shuttle missions; in Saltburn-by-the-Sea, North Yorkshire

March 23, 1964 (Monday)
At Riyadh in Saudi Arabia, Crown Prince Faisal convened a meeting of the other brothers of King Saud of Saudi Arabia, tribal leaders and the 34 principal Muslim patriarchs, to discuss the King's demands for a full restoration of powers that had been taken from him in 1958. The council of civil and religious leaders discussed the problems with the King and agreed that he needed to be stripped of all remaining authority. At the end of the week, King Saud reluctantly agreed to the council's decree, which took away "his armed protection, most of his revenue and half his income", but allowed him to remain as a figurehead monarch.
The first United Nations Conference on Trade and Development (UNCTAD) opened with a session at Geneva. Representatives from 120 nations attended and the conference would last for twelve weeks.
John Lennon's first book, In His Own Write, was published and would become a bestseller in the United Kingdom.
Rock and roll singer Elvis Presley received his discharge from the U.S. Army reserve, after completion of six years of active and reserve duty.
Died: 
Peter Lorre, 59, Hungarian-born American film and TV actor formerly known as Laszlo Lowenstein
Torstein Raaby, 45, Norwegian resistance fighter and explorer, died of heart failure during a polar exploration in Greenland.

March 24, 1964 (Tuesday)
The government of Turkey announced the deportation of all citizens of Greece who had been permitted to live and work, and published its first list of named individuals who were directed to leave with a week. The first group would be forced to sign a statement that they were voluntarily leaving because they had been "involved in illegal economic and political activities", and would depart Istanbul on March 29 "with very little money and few belongings".
Edwin O. Reischauer, the United States Ambassador to Japan, was stabbed and seriously wounded by a deranged teenager outside the U.S. Embassy in Tokyo.  Norikazu Shioya told police that his motive was to call attention to the problems of co-education, which Shioya saw as a threat to Japanese society, and cited one offense as "making girls and boys sit together at the same desk".
Dutchman, an off-Broadway play by African-American playwright LeRoi Jones (later Amiri Baraka) premiered at the Cherry Lane Theatre in New York's Greenwich Village.  It would win the Obie Award for Best American Play later in the year and be turned into a film in 1967.

March 25, 1964 (Wednesday)
Egypt's President Gamal Abdel Nasser proclaimed the new constitution of the United Arab Republic in force, defining the UAR as "a democratic socialist state", and giving himself stronger executive powers in a state with one political party, the Arab Socialist Union.
The Guardianship of Infants Act 1964 was signed into law in the Republic of Ireland.
At a meeting of the Gemini Project Office's Trajectories and Orbits Panel, members of Flight Operations Division described two mission plans currently under consideration for the first Agena rendezvous flight. One was based on the concept of tangential Agena and spacecraft orbits, as proposed by Howard W. Tindall, Jr., and James T. Rose when they were members of Space Task Group. The second plan, based on a proposal by Edwin E. Aldrin, Jr., then of Air Force Space Systems Division, involved orbits which were concentric rather than tangential. The most significant advantage of the second plan was that it provided the greatest utilization of onboard backup techniques; that is, it was specifically designed to make optimum use of remaining onboard systems in the event of failure in the inertial guidance system platform, computer, or radar.

March 26, 1964 (Thursday)

U.S. Army Captain Floyd J. "Jim" Thompson was captured by the Viet Cong in South Vietnam after he and his pilot, Richard L. Whitesides, were shot down over the Quang Tri Province, near the village of A Vao. Whitesides was killed in the crash, while Thompson was sent to a prison camp in North Vietnam, where he would spend almost nine years in captivity. Released on March 16, 1973, ten days short of the anniversary of his capture, Captain Thompson remains the longest serving American prisoner of war.
You Only Live Twice, Ian Fleming's twelfth James Bond novel, and the last of his novels to be published during his lifetime, was released by Jonathan Cape in the United Kingdom.
Gemini boilerplate spacecraft No. 4 was subjected to its first drop from a test rig. The boilerplate achieved a horizontal velocity of 60 feet per second and a vertical velocity of about 40 feet per second at the time of impact with the water. The test was conducted to obtain data on landing accelerations for various speeds and attitudes of the spacecraft.
The propulsion test vehicle assembly (PTVA) arrived at Santa Cruz Test Base. It consisted of a basic Agena structure with propellant pressurization, feed-and-load system, the primary propulsion system (PPS), and two secondary propulsion system (SPS) modules attached to the aft rack. The test program called for loading operations and hot firings of both propulsion systems to establish the adequacy of PPS and SPS propellant loading systems and associated ground equipment, to demonstrate proper overall system operation, and to provide engineering data on systems operation and the resulting environment. Start of testing was delayed by the PPS start tank problems which showed up during Preliminary Flight Rating Tests at Bell Aerosystems during April 1964. Lockheed returned the PTVA main engine start tanks to Bell, where they were inspected and found to be defective. New tanks were ready by mid-May 1964, but additional minor problems delayed the initiation of hot-firing until June 16.
Died: Henry Monck-Mason Moore, 77, British colonial administrator who served as the first Governor-General of Ceylon (now Sri Lanka) after it was granted independence in 1948, serving until 1949. Moore had previously served as Ceylon's Governor (1944–1948), and as Governor of Sierra Leone (1934–1937) and Governor of Kenya (1940–1944).

March 27, 1964 (Friday)
The Soviet Union launched Kosmos 27 to make the first atmospheric probe of the planet Venus, but it failed to escape Earth orbit and would burn up in the atmosphere the next day.
On the same day, Ariel 2, the first satellite equipped for radio astronomy, and only the second to be launched by the United Kingdom, was put into orbit.
UNFICYP, the peacekeeping United Nations Force in Cyprus, became operational. With soldiers from nine nations, the force would reach a level of 6,238 troops and 173 police by June 1964. The force has remained on Cyprus ever since and, more than 50 years later, has 1,100 personnel on the island.
At 5:36 in the afternoon on Good Friday (0336 UTC March 28), the Great Alaskan earthquake, recorded at between 8.6 and 9.2 on the Richter scale, struck the city of Anchorage, Alaska. The tremor, the most powerful earthquake in the United States and the second most powerful in recorded history, killed 131 people and sent waves that struck the coasts of Alaska, British Columbia, Washington, Oregon, and California, as well as forcing the call for 300,000 residents of Hawaii to evacuate. At Valdez, Alaska, 24 dockworkers unloading a ship were killed when the dock was pulled underwater.

March 28, 1964 (Saturday)
The Revolutionary Council that ruled Burma issued the "Law Protecting National Unity" and outlawed all political parties except for the ruling Burma Socialist Programme Party. The law would not be repealed until September 18, 1988.
King Saud of Saudi Arabia surrendered nearly all of his power, but retained his title, after the Saudi royal family pressured him to sign a decree. Saud's younger brother Crown Prince Faisal was granted control of the oil-rich kingdom as the regent for the King.
British Royal Air Force jets, based at the Colony of Aden, bombed a Yemeni army fort at Harib in retaliation for raids by the Yemen Arab Republic on Beihan and killed 25 people. Other members of the United Nations Security Council condemned the raid, although the United Kingdom representative said that it had dropped leaflets 30 minutes before the attack and said that it had acted in self-defense.
Eleven people drowned when the water swept four blocks in from the coast.
Wax likenesses of The Beatles were put on display in London's Madame Tussauds Wax Museum. The Beatles were the first pop stars to be displayed at the museum.
Gemini Project Office reported the results of the potability test of water from the fuel cells to be used on spacecraft No. 2. Although slightly acidic, the water was deemed suitable for drinking.
Alitalia Airlines Flight 45 crashed into the side of Mount Somma, near Mount Vesuvius, as it was preparing to land at Naples on a flight from Rome. The Vickers Viscount turboprop airplane was carrying 45 people at 10:30 on the evening before Easter Sunday.

March 29, 1964 (Sunday)
Radio Caroline became the United Kingdom's first pirate radio station, with a signal heard at 1520 kHz on the AM band. Founded by Ronan O'Rahilly, the station began broadcasting pop music from the ship MV Caroline, formerly the Danish passenger ferry Frederica. Since the ship was anchored three miles (5 km) off the coast of Felixstowe, Suffolk, England, just outside British territorial waters, it was beyond British jurisdiction.
Violent disturbances broke out between two youth gangs, the Mods and Rockers, at the English seaside resort of Clacton-on-Sea on Easter Sunday.

March 30, 1964 (Monday)
A war between Somalia and Ethiopia that had started on February 7 ended after President Ibrahim Abboud of Sudan brokered a ceasefire between the two northeast African nations. With a multinational peacekeeping force from the Organisation of African Unity supporting the cessation of hostilities, Somalian and Ethiopian forces withdrew back from the existing border.
The game show Jeopardy!, created by Merv Griffin, made its debut at 11:30 Eastern time in the U.S., appearing on the NBC television network. Art Fleming served as the show's original host. As a reporter described the format, the show "provides answers in six categories, and three non-celebrity contestants have to supply the correct questions". Premiering half an hour earlier on the ABC network was the less successful Get the Message, hosted by Frank Buxton and described as being "that two celebrities per men-vs.-women side, instead of one, offer "Password"-like clues to contestants trying to guess words and phrases."
Director Robert R. Gilruth announced the reorganization of the Florida unit of the Manned Spacecraft Center (MSC). Renamed MSC-Florida Operations, it would be headed by G. Merritt Preston, who had been in charge of MSC activities at the Cape since 1961. Responsibilities of the reorganized MSC-Florida Operations were similar to those performed and conducted during Project Mercury, with one major exception: Florida personnel would participate in spacecraft testing at McDonnell, thus eliminating the need for so much duplicate testing at Cape Kennedy by ensuring the delivery of a flight-ready spacecraft to the Cape.
Trans-Canada Airlines was renamed Air Canada. Canada's House of Commons had approved the legislation on March 3, in a bill sponsored by future Prime Minister Jean Chrétien from Quebec, who had championed the new name that would work equally well in the French and English languages.

March 31, 1964 (Tuesday)
The UK's Minister of Labour Joseph Godber appointed Lord Justice Pearson to chair a court of inquiry into the electrical power dispute.
João Goulart, the President of Brazil, found himself having to defend his office against a military coup that began after he announced on national television that he would refuse to punish 1,425 sailors of the Brazilian Navy for a mutiny. José de Magalhães Pinto, the Governor of the State of Minas Gerais, called for Goulart's ouster, and General Amaury Kruel commanded the 2d Army Corps in São Paulo in carrying out the overthrow. Units of the Brazilian military would clash for three days; on April 2, the leader of the Chamber of Deputies, Pascoal Ranieri Mazzilli, would be installed as a caretaker president and Goulart would flee to Argentina. For the next 21 years, Brazil would be ruled by a series of generals.
Electrical and mechanical modification of Gemini launch vehicle (GLV) 1 airborne components was completed. GLV-1 had been shipped to the Cape equipped with several items to be used only for ground tests. These were replaced with flight units, beginning January 31. The GLV-1 Wet Mock Simulated Launch, a complete countdown exercise including propellant loading, was successfully completed April 2. Testing concluded on April 5 with a Simulated Flight Test.
Born: Oleksandr Turchynov, Ukrainian politician, economist and screenwriter, in Dnipropetrovsk

References

1964
1964-03
1964-03